Steven Edward Sproat (born 18 November 1960) is an English singer-songwriter, guitarist and ukulele player, who plays a contemporary style of pop music. He has released five studio albums, Straight Down the Line (1989),  Tomorrow's Road (2004), Acer Glade (2007), Full Circle (2011), and Fruit for the Soul (2016).

Early life
Steven Edward Sproat was born on 18 November 1960, in Lanchester, Durham, England, where his father imparted a sense and imbued a love of music upon his son.  His songwriting began in 1985, when he was in his mid-twenties.

Music career
His music recording career commenced in 1988, with his first studio album, Straight Down the Line, released in 1989. He has since released more albums; There's More to Life in 1993, So Far So Good in 1999, Coming to My Senses in 1999, Tomorrow's Road in 2004, Acer Glade in 2007, Full Circle in 2011, and Fruit for the Soul in 2016.
He also supported Jools Holland in 2012 on several shows, and Sproat featured on the Formby TV documentary with Frank Skinner (2011) and subsequently repeated many times on BBC Two and BBC Four.

Author
He authored multiple books about playing the ukulele; the first entitled, Starting Ukulele, in 2007. Sproat's second book was titled, Absolute Beginners – Ukulele, in 2009. He has also been the author of Absolute Beginners Ukulele books 1 & 2, also Starting Ukulele and Starting Ukulele The Next Step (Book 2).

Discography

Studio albums
 Straight Down the Line (1989) 
 Tomorrow's Road (2004)
 Acer Glade (2007)
 Full Circle (2011)
 Fruit for the Soul (2016)

Singles 
School of Thought – "Dance with Me" (1989)vinyl 7"
CDs
 The Big Picture (1999)
"You Turn the Light On" (2006)
"Full Circle" (2011) 
 Holding On (2014)
"Fruit for the Soul" (2016)
 Watersmeet (Classical Piano version ) (2016)
 To High, To Quickly (2017 )
 Back in Line (2019 )
 A thing called grace ( 2022)

References

External links

1960 births
Living people
British ukulele players
English Christians
English pop singers
English pop guitarists
English male singer-songwriters
People from Lanchester, County Durham